Charles Baker (born ) is an American actor, writer, and director. He is best known for playing Skinny Pete on the AMC series Breaking Bad, and he has had a recurring role on the NBC series The Blacklist.

He reprised the role of Skinny Pete in the film El Camino: A Breaking Bad Movie, which was released on Netflix on October 11, 2019.

Early life
Baker is the son of a U.S. Army colonel, and as a result, he moved frequently during his childhood. Though he had aspirations to become a teacher, he double majored in music and theater in college.

Career
Baker began appearing in small budget movies including Playing Dead and Fat Girls. He also dubbed for Japanese anime series, One Piece. In 2006, he wrote, composed, produced, and directed his own short film called The Waterson Project. In 2007, he was cast in the direct-to-video sequel of Walking Tall. In 2008, he was cast in the horror film Splinter. He was cast in Terrence Malick's To the Wonder in 2011.

He was cast in Breaking Bad as Skinny Pete, a close associate and friend of Jesse Pinkman who served time in prison. His original character name was supposed to be "skinny stoner" in the audition. He was called back a few days later and his part was expanded. After the filming of his first episode, he was called and asked to return for future episodes. His ability to play the piano was noticed by the writers of the show and in the Season Five episode "Hazard Pay", he plays an intricate piano melody (CPE Bach - Solfeggietto) on a keyboard. In early 2013, he was cast in the television pilot of The Blacklist starring James Spader. In mid 2013, Baker was cast in Ain't Them Bodies Saints. In mid-2014, he was cast in Wild starring Reese Witherspoon. He was also cast in a recurring role in TNT's Murder in the First.

Filmography

Film

Television

References

External links

TV Guide
Q&A – Charles Baker (Skinny Pete) at AMCtv.com 

Living people
21st-century American male actors
American male film actors
American male television actors
American male voice actors
American male pianists
21st-century American pianists
21st-century American male musicians
Year of birth missing (living people)